Lute Player is an early 17th-century painting by French artist Valentin de Boulogne. Done in oil on canvas, the painting depicts a young soldier playing a lute. The painting was originally in the collection of Cardinal Mazarin, and is currently in the collection of the Metropolitan Museum of Art, in New York.

Description
Lute was rendered by Valentin de Boulogne between 1625 and 1626 in Rome. The work was then sold, and first appears in the collection of Cardinal Mazarin, a French political minister who owned nine other works by de Boulogne. The painting's title and central figure may be self-referential as de Boulogne's nickname in Rome was "Amador", which has been loosely translated from Spanish as "lover boy".

The painting itself depicts a young man playing a lute. The figure is clad in rich clothing and a steel gorget, indicating he is a soldier - likely a Spanish mercenary. Like many of de Boulogne's paintings, Lute is heavily influenced by tenebrism, a style of art popularized by de Boulogne's contemporary Caravaggio.

References

1626 paintings
Paintings by Valentin de Boulogne
Paintings in the collection of the Metropolitan Museum of Art
Musical instruments in art